Epiphyllum phyllanthus, commonly known as the climbing cactus, is a species of epiphytic cacti. It has no leaves, instead having stems that photosynthesise. It is thought to be pollinated by hawkmoths, as the flowers only open at night and produce a strong fragrance.

It is the most common epiphyte on the tree, Platypodium elegans, particularly growing in cavities in the trunk.

References

External links
Epiphyllum phyllanthus at Discover Life, including photographs.

phyllanthus